The Sydney Olympic Park bus routes operate from various places in Sydney to Sydney Olympic Park when significant cultural or sporting events are held at the Sydney Olympic Park precinct.

History
As part of its winning bid for the 2000 Olympic Games, a new complex was built. Only minimal car parking was provided, with it intended that most patrons traveling to the complex would use public transport. Included was a railway line but this still left parts of Sydney without direct access.

To address this, a series of bus routes were devised. These services commenced in 1998 in conjunction with the Sydney Royal Easter Show moving from Moore Park to the Olympic venue. With a few adjustments, these remain today. The routes operate at events such as the Royal Easter Show, State of Origin and NRL Grand Final and other major events as decreed by the State Government.

Routes
As of April 2022, the major event bus routes are:

References

External links

Bus routes in Sydney
Sydney Olympic Park